Mikhail Vyacheslavovich Gabyshev (born 2 January 1990) is a Kazakhstani football player who plays for Astana.

Career

Club
On 15 July 2022, Astana announced the signing of Gabyshev from Shakhter Karagandy.

International
Gabyshev made his debut for Kazakhstan national football team on 4 June 2021 in a friendly against North Macedonia. He substituted Yerkin Tapalov in the 83rd minute.

International goals
Scores and results list Kazakhstan's goal tally first.

References

External links
 
 

1990 births
Sportspeople from Zabaykalsky Krai
People from Zabaykalsky Krai
Living people
Kazakhstani footballers
Kazakhstan international footballers
Association football defenders
FC Vostok players
FC Shakhter Karagandy players
FC Caspiy players
FC Atyrau players
Kazakhstan Premier League players
Kazakhstan First Division players
Kazakhstan under-21 international footballers